Shades of Grey: The Road to High Saffron (2012, simply titled Shades of Grey originally) is a dystopian novel, the first in the Shades of Grey series by novelist Jasper Fforde. The story takes place in Chromatacia, an alternative version of the United Kingdom wherein social class is determined by one's ability to perceive colour.

Plot
Chromatacia is a future dystopian society that exists at least five hundred years (although possibly more) after the collapse of our own society, identified as 'the Previous'. All life is governed by the laws set by Munsell, the supposed and revered founder of Chromatacia. The rules range from sensible, such as outlawing murder, to bizarre, such as outlawing the manufacture of spoons (though old spoons are often kept as personal heirlooms). The social hierarchy of Chromatacia is defined by the ability to see colour, which is limited in most people to varying degrees of one hue, or at most two. Those who can see red predominantly are in the second-lowest social order (only ranking above 'Greys', who cannot perceive colour), and 'Ultra Violets' hold the highest rank. The perception of colour also affects their health and wellness: certain colours have medical effects on people. Doctors in this world are called "swatchmen", since they show swatches of colour to their patients. Shades of green, especially Lincoln green, act as a narcotic, and are often abused as recreational drugs. Surnames and names of towns are usually derived from various shades of colour, such as jade, carmine and saffron.

Protagonist Eddie Russett is a 'Red' sent to the outer-fringe town of East Carmine to conduct a chair census, which he speculates is punishment for a practical joke played on the son of a prefect. There he meets Jane, a Grey with an upturned nose and a fierce temper, who often causes personal injury to whomever she meets. Eddie's father becomes the swatchman of the village and is well liked by the Greys. In the course of the story, Eddie discovers that much of what the government has told the public is not true. Specifically he learns that misfits, supposedly sent to Emerald City to be brainwashed, are taken to the deserted town of High Saffron where they are killed by looking at a building whose colour is poisonous.

Details reveal that East Carmine is located in Wales (the A470 road is mentioned), and the description of the town close to the lower of a series of five dams suggests it is Rhayader, at the foot of the Elan Valley. Nearby Rusty Hill was once Builth Wells. The town of Vermillion used to be Hereford. The town of High Saffron is on the coast beyond the dams, which suggests Aberystwyth.

The colour values as described in the book supposedly come from the Munsell color system as described by Albert Henry Munsell, but are derived from the HSV color model. The "Ishihara", a test used to determine one's colour vision, is a reference to Shinobu Ishihara, the inventor of the Ishihara colour perception test.

Characters
 Eddie Russett: Protagonist, a Red with good perception. He has unquestioningly toed the line for twenty years but learning the truth behind the Collective disrupts his life.
 Jane G23: A rather violent and short-tempered Grey who has some rare abilities. 
 Violet deMauve: A spoilt brat on the Blue side of Purple (her mother was Navy) who always gets her way and is determined to marry Eddie to bring her family line back to full Purple.
 Tommo Cinnabar: A Red with a huge array of scams, deals and negotiations going on. He would sell his own grandmother if the price was right, and did on one occasion.
 Dorian: A Grey, the editor of the local newspaper and a very talented photographer. Wishes to elope with Imogen. 
 Courtland Gamboge: The Yellow Deputy Prefect who abuses his power and is interested only in making himself look good. He and Eddie do not see eye to eye on anything.
 Sally Gamboge: East Carmine's Yellow Prefect, a nasty piece of work who looks out for her own family.
 Holden Russett: A Red, Eddie's father and the village Swatchman.
 Travis Canary: A fallen Yellow who is escaping from Reboot. He runs out of the village into the night one evening.
 Bunty McMustard: An officious Yellow.
 Imogen Fandango: A low-level Purple who is in love with Dorian. They want to elope.
 Carlos Fandango: The lowest-level Purple in East Carmine, and the Janitor, responsible for maintaining the two cars and the street lights.
 Lucy Ochre: A young Red girl with an obsession with hidden harmonies in the Earth.
 George deMauve: Purple Prefect, and Head Prefect of East Carmine. He is interested only in getting his daughter married to a strong Red and the family getting back up to hue.
 Mr Turquoise: East Carmine's Blue Prefect
 Mr Yewberry: East Carmine's Red Prefect
 Constance Oxblood: Eddie's sweetheart, although the feeling is mostly on Eddie's side. She is a wealthy Red and has to choose between marrying Eddie or Roger Maroon.
 Mrs Lapis-Lazuli: A Blue ninth-generation librarian in East Carmine
 Matthew Gloss: An employee from National Colour who is in East Carmine to conduct the Ishihara tests and supposedly fix a leaking magenta pipe. It is implied that he is a Red. He encourages Eddie to join National Colour, but appears to have a darker side.
 Velma Ochre: A slightly eccentric Red who wishes to marry Holden Russett.
 Bertie Magenta: A posh Purple from Jade-under-Lime, on whom Eddie plays a prank that results in him getting sent to East Carmine.
 Zane: A grey who disguised as a purple in Vermillion, we later find out he's part of a bigger picture.

Inspiration
The beginning of the book contains a quote from philosopher Alfred North Whitehead on the subject of colour:

Series
In a 2009 interview, the author mentioned two further books in the series. The titles Painting by Numbers and The Gordini Protocols have been suggested; however, neither is scheduled for publication . In February 2021 Jasper Fforde announced on twitter @jasperfforde that
"In March I start work on Shades of Grey II, which should be published 2022. Now, those pesky swans.."

References

External links
 jasperfforde.com

2009 British novels
Novels by Jasper Fforde
2009 science fiction novels
British science fiction novels
2009 fantasy novels
British fantasy novels
Dystopian novels
Hodder & Stoughton books
Novels set in the future
Bureaucracy in fiction